Abu Jarash is a neighborhood and district of the al-Salihiyah municipality of Damascus, Syria. It had a population of 12,798 in the 2004 census. In the 1936 French Mandate census, Abu Jarash had a population of 9,600, all Muslims. The neighborhood was built around the domed mausoleum of Abu Jarash, also known as Abdallah ibn Sala al-Raqqi, a high-ranking Ayyubid royal court official.

References

Neighborhoods of Damascus